Shelly Park is a South eastern suburb of Auckland, in northern New Zealand. The suburb is in the Howick ward, one of thirteen electoral divisions of the Auckland Council.

It is named after the beach of the same name.

Shelly Park Cruising Club (SPCC) is a yacht club at this beach which also offers dry docking facilities and the beach is an access point to the estuary where boats are moored.

The beach is also one end of a nature walkway - Mangemangeroa Reserve - which runs from there to Somerville Road.

Demographics

Shelly Park had a population of 2,850 at the 2018 New Zealand census, an increase of 39 people (1.4%) since the 2013 census, and an increase of 90 people (3.3%) since the 2006 census. There were 933 households, comprising 1,392 males and 1,458 females, giving a sex ratio of 0.95 males per female. The median age was 40.6 years (compared with 37.4 years nationally), with 552 people (19.4%) aged under 15 years, 543 (19.1%) aged 15 to 29, 1,350 (47.4%) aged 30 to 64, and 405 (14.2%) aged 65 or older.

Ethnicities were 78.9% European/Pākehā, 4.8% Māori, 2.3% Pacific peoples, 17.9% Asian, and 1.8% other ethnicities. People may identify with more than one ethnicity.

The percentage of people born overseas was 44.3, compared with 27.1% nationally.

Although some people chose not to answer the census's question about religious affiliation, 47.2% had no religion, 40.6% were Christian, 0.2% had Māori religious beliefs, 1.4% were Hindu, 0.5% were Muslim, 0.9% were Buddhist and 2.7% had other religions.

Of those at least 15 years old, 678 (29.5%) people had a bachelor's or higher degree, and 219 (9.5%) people had no formal qualifications. The median income was $42,600, compared with $31,800 nationally. 690 people (30.0%) earned over $70,000 compared to 17.2% nationally. The employment status of those at least 15 was that 1,227 (53.4%) people were employed full-time, 348 (15.1%) were part-time, and 75 (3.3%) were unemployed.

Education
Shelly Park Primary School is a contributing primary school (Year 1-6) with a roll of ..

References 

Suburbs of Auckland
Beaches of the Auckland Region
Populated places around the Hauraki Gulf / Tīkapa Moana
Howick Local Board Area